Otter Creek Township is one of eleven townships in Jersey County, Illinois, United States.  As of the 2010 census, its population was 1,035 and it contained 422 housing units.

Geography

Cities, towns, villages
 Otterville

Adjacent townships
 English Township (north)
 Jersey Township (northeast)
 Mississippi Township (east)
 Elsah Township (southeast)
 Quarry Township (southwest)
 Rosedale Township (west)
 Richwood Township (northwest)

Cemeteries
The township contains these eleven cemeteries: Dabbs, Davenport, Dougherty, Edsall, Hamilton, Hinson, Lewis, McDowell, Noble Family, Salem and White.

Landmarks
 Pere Marquette State Park (northeastern portion)

Demographics

School districts
 Jersey Community Unit School District 100

Political districts
 Illinois' 17th congressional district
 State House District 97
 State Senate District 49

References
 
 United States Census Bureau 2007 TIGER/Line Shapefiles
 United States National Atlas

External links
 City-Data.com
 Illinois State Archives

Townships in Jersey County, Illinois
Townships in Illinois